Firman Utina (born 15 December 1981) is a retired Indonesian professional footballer, he normally plays as an attacking midfielder. Throughout his career, Firman has played for several clubs in Indonesia, most notably winning league titles with Sriwijaya, Persib Bandung, and Bhayangkara. 

At national level, Firman played for Indonesia in the under-19 and under-23 level, prior to his senior team debut in a 2002 FIFA World Cup qualification match against Cambodia in 2001. After his debut, he became regular call-up to the national side for 13 years, participating in four editions of the AFF Championship as well as the 2007 AFC Asian Cup. In the latter tournament, he arguably put his best performance when he was chosen as man of the match for Indonesia against Bahrain in a group stage match, which Indonesia won 2–1 due to his contribution for Indonesia's goals. He captained Indonesia at the 2010 AFF Championship and was crowned the tournament's most valuable player.

Personal life
Firman Utina is Muslim who observes the Islamic month of Ramadan.

International career

National team

International goals

Honours
Arema Malang
 Copa Indonesia: 2005, 2006

Sriwijaya
 Indonesia Super League: 2011–12
 Indonesian Community Shield: 2010

Persib Bandung
 Indonesia Super League: 2014
 Piala Presiden: 2015

Bhayangkara
 Liga 1: 2017
Indonesia
 Indonesian Independence Cup: 2008
 AFF Championship runner-up: 2004, 2010

Individual 
Copa Indonesia Best Player: 2005
 AFF Championship Most Valuable Player: 2010

References

External links

 

1981 births
Living people
People from Manado
Indonesian Muslims
Indonesian footballers
2007 AFC Asian Cup players
Indonesia international footballers
Persma Manado players
Persita Tangerang players
Arema F.C. players
Pelita Jaya FC players
Sriwijaya F.C. players
Persib Bandung players
Indonesian Premier Division players
Liga 1 (Indonesia) players
Association football utility players
Association football midfielders
Indonesian Super League-winning players
Sportspeople from North Sulawesi